Sunnyside High School, opened in 1955, is home to two thousand students located on the south side of Tucson, Arizona. Sunnyside offers a variety of extracurricular programs, advanced placement courses, and specialized career and technical training programs. It is a part of the Sunnyside Unified School District.

History
Sunnyside High School opened in 1955 with 9th and 10th grade classes.

The original mascot logo for Sunnyside used a variation of Arizona State University's Sparky mascot. The school was forced to change after the university learned of this use when Sunnyside played a championship game at ASU's Sun Devil Stadium.

Campus

Sunnyside High School is located on the south side of Tucson, Arizona.

Curriculum
There is a widespread of curriculum that is offered at Sunnyside High School.

Departments of Instruction 
Sunnyside High School offers these courses either for class credits, or elective credit:
 Automotive Collision Repair Technology
 Automotive Technology
 Business/Business Information Technology
 English Language Development
 FBLA (Future Business Leaders of America) – Business Management and Administrative Services
 Fine Arts
 Graphic Communications
 Health
 Industrial Technology
 Information/Computer Technology
 Language Arts
 Library
 Life Management
 Marketing
 Mathematics
 Medical Careers
 Music
 Photography
 Physical Education
 Precision Metals Technology
 Publications
 Radio and Television Technology
 Science
 Social Studies
 World Languages
 Choir
 Sports Medicine Club
 Skills USA

Courses or college credit 
Below are courses available to students, for both high-school:
 Writing 101
 Computers Maintenance
 Web Design and Development

Academics and enhanced courses 
 Advanced Placement Courses
 Honors Academy
 Honors Courses
 Medical Careers Academy
 Tech Prep/Work-Based Learning
 CISCO Academy-A+, Net+ Certifications

Extracurricular activities
 Fine Arts: Concert Band, Dancing, Drum Line, Folklorico, Jazz Ensemble, Marching Band, Mariachi, Orchestra, Painting, Photography, and Pottery
 Publications: media video communications, and yearbook
 Clubs: Anytown, Blue Wires, DECA, HOSA, MESA, National Honor Society, Student Government, YES Club, Sunnyside Web Company, FBLA (Future Business Leaders of America)
 Sports: Division 5A: boys volleyball, baseball, basketball, bowling, cross country, football, golf, soccer, softball, swimming, tennis, track, volleyball, wrestling, Gymnastics
 Sunnyside Blue Devil Dance Team
 Wildcat Society
 Sunnyside Cheer Team

Athletics
Sunnyside High School is a member of the Arizona Interscholastic Association and is classed in its 5A conference. A wrestling powerhouse in Arizona, Sunnyside has won 30 state championships (14 in a row, 1998–2011). It lost a dual-meet 12 December 2015, where Green Valley (NV) snapped a 314 win streak stretching from 1999 to then, and only has lost ten since 1969. However, recently Sunnyside Wrestling has regain its championship title in 2018. The teams are known as the Sunnyside Blue Devils. Athletic teams are fielded in boys volleyball, baseball, basketball, cheerleading, cross country, football, golf, soccer, softball, tennis, track and field, volleyball, wrestling, and swimming.

The varsity football team was featured on the Great American Rivalries Series in 2009 against Salpointe Catholic High School.

Arizona State Championship titles
 Boys Basketball: 1993 (4A)
 Football: 2001 (4A), 2003 (4A)
 Wrestling: 1979, 1981, 1982, 1983, 1984, 1985, 1986, 1987, 1988, 1990, 1991, 1992, 1993, 1994, 1996, 1998, 1999, 2000, 2001, 2002, 2003, 2004, 2005, 2006, 2007, 2008, 2009, 2010, 2011, 2013, 2018, 2019, 2020, 2021
 Cheerleading: 2000
 Softball: 2007
 Boys Cross-Country: 1966, 1975, 2008
 Boys Soccer: 2019
 Girls Volleyball: 1990

Music
There are various musical performing groups at Sunnyside.

Performing groups as well as their director(s):
 Sunnyside Jazz Ensemble, Erik Ellison.
 The Pride of Sunnyside Marching Band, Erik Ellison.
 Sunnyside Wind Ensemble, Erik Ellison.
 Sunnyside Choir, Erik Ellison.
 Los Diablitos Azules Mariachi.
 Sunnyside Orchestra, Hayley Britt.

The Pride of Sunnyside Marching Band

History
 2006: Scott Matlick, Drum Major for The Pride of Arizona (2002–2004), is hired as Director of Bands at Sunnyside High School. Reinvents the band, dawning the name The Pride of Sunnyside Marching Band. The band's show is Gladiator picked by previous Director Alli Coyle.
 2007: Scott Matlick introduces the show "Adentro: The Music of Ricardo Arjona", based on Latin singer-songwriter Ricardo Arjona's album Adentro. The tradition of the marching on to the field in the opening set known as the "S" is brought back to commemorate the school's 50th anniversary. After two years as Director of Bands at Sunnyside, Scott Matlick returns to the University of Arizona to be part of the Graduate Teaching Assistant program for the UA Bands and The Pride of Arizona.
 2008: During the summer the band was temporarily under the direction of Joseph Molinar. The band plays "The Return of Aerosmith" the show Director Alli Coyle created in 2005 for the band. In early August the band gets Director of Bands Matthew Hoolsema from Michigan. Under the new direction of Matthew Hoolsema, the school's choir program is brought back.
 2009: Matthew Hoolsema introduces the show Music of the Big Band Era. The program includes tunes "La Suerte De Los Tontos", " House of the Rising Sun", "Blue Groove", and "Big Noise from Winnetka". The band reached the state marching competition.
 2010: Although not as successful as the previous year, the Pride of Sunnyside continued to a new season with the music of Journey.

Recent directors
 2004–2006: Alli Coyle
 2006–2008: Scott Matlick
 2008–2011: Matthew Hoolsema
 2011: Armando Salas
 2012–2019: Rusty Carle-Ogren
 2019–present: Erik Ellison

Recent field shows

Under Alli Coyle:
 2004: Mask of Zorro
 2005: The Music of Aerosmith
Under Scott Matlick:
 2006: Gladiator
 2007: Adentro: The Music of Ricardo Arjona
Under Matthew Hoolsema:
 2008: The Return of Aerosmith
 2009: The Music of the Big Band Era
 2010: The Music of Journey
Under Armando Salas:
 2011: Latin Sketches
Under Rusty Carle-Ogren:
 2012: Symphonic Passions
 2013: 80s and Gentleman
 2014: Les Misérables
 2015: Cirque De Solei
 2016: When the Stars Come Out
 2017: The Labyrinth
 2018: Macabre

Student groups

 Academic Decathlon
 Astronomy
 Blue Devil Dancers
 Blue Devil Images
 Blue Devil News
 Cafe Diablo
 Chess Club
 DECA
 Drama/Thespians
 El Diablo
 Folklorico
 Four Feathers Club
 French Club
 Fashion design
 Health Care Tech

 Hero Club
 Honors Academy
 Jobs for America's Graduates
 MASCC
 Mariachi
 MECHA Club
 MESA
 National Honor Art Club
 Photography Club
 Pride of Sunnyside marching band
 National Honor Society
 NEOS Teatro
 Noche de las Estrellas
 Peer Advisor
 Photography
 Poetry Club

 P.R.I.S.M. (Gay–straight alliance)
 Southern Arizona Border Health Careers Opportunity Program
 Spanish
 Teenage Parent Program (T.A.P.P.)
 Teachers of Tomorrow
 Tri-M
 VICA
 Video Production
 Wildcat Society
 Writing Devils
 Youth Alive

Notable alumni

 David Adams, former NFL player
 Raul Grijalva, Representative for Arizona's 3rd congressional district
 Harry Holt, former NFL player
 Matthew Lopez, professional UFC fighter; RFA most wins and finishes in history; Sunnyside's first 4x state wrestling champion
 Ned Norris, Jr., Chairman of the Tohono O'odham Nation since 2007
 Mike Scurlock, former NFL player
 Michael Smith, former NFL player
 James Terry, professional MMA fighter
 Roman Bravo Young, NCAA champion wrestler for Penn State University

Notable faculty
Two faculty members have been recognized as Arizona Teacher of the Year, Marguerite Johnson Caldwell in 1983 and Rich Mayorga in 2003.

See also
 Desert View High School
 Sunnyside Unified School District

References

External links
 Sunnyside High School
 Sunnyside Blue Devils Football

Schools in Tucson, Arizona
Educational institutions established in 1955
Public high schools in Arizona
1955 establishments in Arizona